Wróblew may refer to the following places:
Wróblew, Sieradz County in Łódź Voivodeship (central Poland)
Wróblew, Wieluń County in Łódź Voivodeship (central Poland)
Wróblew, Zgierz County in Łódź Voivodeship (central Poland)
 The gentlemen's club located in the center of the city.